Maloka may refer to:
 Maloca, a type of house used by indigenous people of the Amazon
 Maloka Museum, a museum of sciences in Bogotá, Colombia
 79889 Maloka, a minor planet

See also 
 Mallorca